Michael Ronald Taylor (1 June 1938, Ealing, West London – 19 January 1969) was a British jazz composer, pianist and co-songwriter for the band Cream.

Biography
Mike Taylor was brought up by his grandparents in London and Kent, and joined the RAF for his national service. Having rehearsed and written extensively throughout the early 1960s, he recorded two albums for the Lansdowne series produced by Denis Preston: Pendulum (1966) with drummer Jon Hiseman, bassist Tony Reeves and saxophonist Dave Tomlin and Trio (1967) with Hiseman and bassists Jack Bruce and Ron Rubin. The albums were issued on UK Columbia.

During his brief recording career, several of Taylor's pieces were played and recorded by his contemporaries. Three Taylor compositions were recorded by Cream, with lyrics by drummer Ginger Baker: "Passing the Time", "Pressed Rat and Warthog" and "Those Were the Days", all of which appeared on the band's August 1968 album Wheels of Fire. Neil Ardley's New Jazz Orchestra's September 1968 recording Le Déjeuner Sur L’Herbe features one original Taylor composition, "Ballad", and an arrangement by him of a piece by Alexandre Tansman, "Study".

Mike Taylor drowned in the River Thames near Leigh-on-Sea, Essex, in January 1969, following years of heavy drug use (principally hashish and LSD). He had been homeless for three years, and his death was almost entirely unremarked.

In 2007, the independent record label, Dusk Fire Records, released for the first time the album Mike Taylor Remembered, a 1973 tribute to the musician recorded by Ardley, Hiseman, Ian Carr, Barbara Thompson, Tony Reeves and other major modern British jazz players.

In 2015, Gonzo Multimedia published Out of Nowhere, the first biography on Taylor, by Italian writer Luca Ferrari.

See also
Graham Bond
Pete Brown
Janet Godfrey

External links

Trio album review by John Fordham in The Guardian, 9 July 2004

1938 births
1969 deaths
British songwriters
Cream (band)
Deaths by drowning in the United Kingdom
20th-century English musicians
Royal Air Force airmen
New Jazz Orchestra members